402 FC was an American amateur soccer team based in Omaha, Nebraska, United States. Founded in 2008, the team played in Region II of the United States Adult Soccer Association, a network of amateur leagues at the fifth tier of the American Soccer Pyramid.

They played its home games at Morrison Stadium on the campus of Creighton University. The team's colors were blue and white.

History
402 FC was formed in 2008 by Jason Mims, a former Saint Louis University player and current assistant soccer coach for Creighton University, to provide a way for young soccer players from Nebraska to compete in high-level nationwide competition. The team is named after Eastern Nebraska’s telephone area code.

402 qualified for the final stages of the 2009 Lamar Hunt U.S. Open Cup at the first attempt, by beating the Minnesota Hawks and RWB Adria in their regional qualification tournament, and in doing so became the first team from Nebraska ever to appear in the main draw of the US Open Cup. They lost 3–2 in the first round to USL First Division side Minnesota Thunder. 402's goals in the Thunder game were scored by Andrei Gotsmanov and Tony Schmitz.

The team played in the qualifying tournament for the 2010 Lamar Hunt U.S. Open Cup, and beat St. Paul Twin Stars of the National Premier Soccer League in the first game, but were knocked out at the final qualifying stage, 4–2 on penalties, by Detroit United.

Players

2009 USOC roster

Year-by-year

Head coaches
  Jason Mims (2008–present)

Stadia
 Morrison Stadium at Creighton University; Omaha, Nebraska  (2008–present)

References

Defunct soccer clubs in Nebraska
2008 establishments in Nebraska
Association football clubs established in 2008
Association football clubs disestablished in 2011
2011 disestablishments in Nebraska